Ramil "Ray" Arcel (August 30, 1899 – March 7, 1994) was an American boxing trainer who was active from the 1920s through the 1980s. He trained 20 world champions.

Life and career
Arcel was born in Terre Haute, Indiana, the son of Rose (Wachsman) and David Arcel. His parents were Jewish immigrants from Russia and Romania. He moved to New York City before he was six years old. He grew up in Harlem and graduated from Stuyvesant High School in 1917. He began training fighters at Stillman's Gym, near the old location of Madison Square Garden on 8th Avenue, in the 1920s. The champions he trained were Benny Leonard, Ezzard Charles, Jim Braddock, Barney Ross, Bob Olin, Tony Zale, Billy Soose, Ceferino Garcia, Lou Brouillard, Teddy Yarosz, Freddie Steele, Jackie Kid Berg, Alfonso Frazier, Abe Goldstein, Frankie Genaro, Tony Marino, Sixto Escobar, Charley Phil Rosenberg, Roberto Durán and Larry Holmes.

After some disputes with Jim Norris and the International Boxing Club in the 1950s,  Arcel retired from training, after being injured with a lead pipe during an attack in Boston, in a case that was never solved by police, returning in the 1970s to work with Alfonso Frazier and Roberto Durán. After Durán quit in his second fight against Sugar Ray Leonard, Arcel helped prepare Larry Holmes for his fight against Gerry Cooney. He retired from training after that fight, having returned to Durán's corner in January 1982 for Durán's fight against Wilfred Benítez.

Arcel died on March 7, 1994, at the age of 94. His first wife, Hazel, died on August 8, 2014 and his daughter Adele Arcel Bloch died on February 8, 1990.

His second wife and widow, Stephanie Arcel, died in 2014.

Actor Robert De Niro portrayed Arcel in the 2016 film Hands of Stone, about Roberto Durán, with actress Ellen Barkin portraying his wife Stephanie.

References

External links

Ray Arcel at Wabash Valley Profiles

American boxing trainers
American Jews
International Boxing Hall of Fame inductees
Stuyvesant High School alumni
1899 births
1994 deaths
International Jewish Sports Hall of Fame inductees